Polyscias dichroostachya is a species of plant in the family Araliaceae. It is endemic to Mauritius, where it used to be common in the forests of the south-west of the island.

It can be distinguished from the other Polyscias by its distinctive flower-spike and its more large, square leaf-segments of its compound leaves.

References

Endemic flora of Mauritius
dichroostachya
Endangered plants
Taxonomy articles created by Polbot